These are the results of the men's 4 × 400 metres relay event at the 1995 World Championships in Athletics in Gothenburg, Sweden.

Medalists

* Runners who participated in the heats only and received medals.

Results

Heats
Qualification: First 2 of each heat plus the 2 fastest times advance to the final.

Final

References
 Results
 IAAF

- Mens 4x400 Metres Relay
Relays at the World Athletics Championships